David Allen "Davey" Faragher (born August 18, 1957) is an American bass guitarist from Redlands, California. Faragher's career took off and received critical notice as a founding member of the nineties band Cracker, and his subsequent work with John Hiatt's band, and The Imposters, the backing band for Elvis Costello since 2001.  In 2015, Faragher joined Richard Thompson's Electric Trio for Thompson's Still album and US tour.

Faragher is an accomplished session musician, and has a strong portfolio of performances with notable musicians.

Biography
In the mid-to-late 1970s, Faragher recorded three albums with his brothers Danny Faragher, Jimmy, and Tommy Faragher as The Faragher Brothers.  Later, the band was renamed The Faraghers for a fourth album, featuring fifth brother Marty and sister Pammy. From there he became one of Los Angeles' most sought after bass players, and was featured in Bass Player magazine in February, 2001.

He also plays club gigs where he currently resides in Los Angeles near fellow Imposter Pete Thomas and guitarist Val McCallum under the band name Jackshit. The trio was featured in the Spring 2002 issue of Grindstone Magazine.

Cracker
Faragher was a founding member of the band Cracker in the early 1990s. Faragher shared a writing credit on the band's 1993 hit "Low," among others, and was given the cover feature story of BAM magazine in July 1992.  During his time in Cracker, Faragher would perform in a dress.  When the band performed on Late Night with David Letterman, the show's host made a joke about it.

John Hiatt collaboration
After his departure from Cracker late in 1993, Faragher became bass player in John Hiatt's band through the late 1990s. He was credited as associate producer for John Hiatt's 1995 Walk On album, and producer (with Hiatt) on his 1997 Little Head album.

Session work
Faragher has worked much of his career as a session musician, recording with such notables as The Monkees (on their 1986 reunion album Pool It!), David Crosby, John Phillips, Wanda Jackson, Dusty Springfield, Red House Painters, Bonnie Raitt, Sheryl Crow, Susanna Hoffs, Vonda Shepard, Joan Osborne, Ronnie Montrose, Mark Kozelek, Shivaree, Guster, The Finn Brothers, Camper Van Beethoven, Chantal Kreviazuk, Allen Toussaint, Dr. Zwig, Buddy Guy, Willy DeVille and The Ditty Bops. He is thanked in the liner-notes for Counting Crows' hit single "Hanginaround" on This Desert Life (produced by former Cracker bandmate David Lowery).

In February 2007, he was seen playing the part of the bass player in Scrantonicity, the band featured in The Office episode, "Phyllis' Wedding." In January 2008, it was reported in Billboard that a new supergroup tentatively called the Scrolls, (now officially Works Progress Administration (W.P.A.)) had formed. The octet is composed of Faragher, Sean Watkins (guitar), his sister Sara Watkins (fiddle), Glen Phillips (guitar, vocals), Benmont Tench (piano), Luke Bulla (fiddle), Greg Leisz (various), and Pete Thomas (drums). The group released their debut album in late 2009.
In 2010, Faragher played as a session bassist for The Union, a Grammy Award-nominated collaboration by Elton John and Leon Russell.

Collaborations 
With Elton John and Leon Russell
 The Union (Mercury Records, 2010)

With Dusty Springfield
 White Heat (Casablanca Records, 1982)

With Peter Stuart
 Propeller (Vanguard Records, 2002)

With Chris Shiflett
 Chris Shiflett & the Dead Peasants (RCA Records, 2010)

With Andrew Ridgeley
 Son of Albert (Columbia Records, 1990)

With Katey Sagal
 Room (Valley Entertainment, 2004)
 Covered (E1 Music, 2013)

With Sharon Corr
 The Same Sun (BobbyJean, 2013)

With Mandy Moore
 Silver Landings (Verve Records, 2020)
 In Real Life (Verve Records, 2022)

With Susanna Hoffs
 Susanna Hoffs (London Records, 1996)
 Someday (Baroque Folk, 2012)

With Jeffrey Gaines
 Alright (Omnivore Recordings, 2018)

With Heather Nova
 South (V2 Records, 2001)

With Paul Young
 The Crossing (Columbia Records, 1993)

With Rufus Wainwright
 Unfollow the Rules (BMG, 2020)

With Chuck Prophet
 Feast of Hearts (China Records, 1995)
 Age of Miracles (New West Records, 2004)

With Missy Higgins
 On a Clear Night (Reprise Records, 2007)

With La Toya Jackson
 Imagination (Epic Records, 1986)

With A. J. Croce
 Adrian James Croce (Seedling Records, 2004)
 Cage of Muses (Seedling Records, 2009)

With Willy DeVille
 Loup Garou (EastWest Records, 1995)
 Pistola (Eagle Records, 2008)

With Daniel Powter
 Daniel Powter (Warner Bros. Records, 2005)

With Jenny Lewis
 Acid Tongue (Warner Bros. Records, 2008)

With Cock Robin
 First Love / Last Rites (CBS Records, 1989)

With Greg Holden
 I Don't Believe You (Falling Art Recordings, 2011)

With Tracy Bonham
 Blink the Brightest (Zoe Records, 2005)

With Peter Criss
 Let Me Rock You (Casablanca Records, 1982)

With Jackson Browne
 Downhill from Everywhere (Inside Records, 2021)

With Jonatha Brooke
 Steady Pull (Bad Dog Records, 2001)

With Shelby Lynne and Allison Moorer
 Not Dark Yet (Thirty Tigers, 2017)

With Ron Sexsmith
 Time Being (V2 Records, 2006)
 Forever Endeavour (Cooking Vinyl, 2013)

With Jann Arden
 Blood Red Cherry (Universal Music, 2000)

With Elvis Costello
 When I Was Cruel (Mercury Records, 2002)
 North (Deutsche Grammophon, 2003)
 The Delivery Man (Lost Highway Records, 2004)
 The River in Reverse (Verve Forecast, 2006)
 Momofuku (Lost Highway Records, 2008)
 National Ransom (Universal Records, 2010)
 Look Now (Concord Records, 2018)
 The Boy Named If (Capitol Records, 2022)

With James Reyne
 James Reyne (Capitol Records, 1987)

With Jessica Riddle
 Key of a Minor (Hollywood Records, 2000)

With Sheryl Crow
 Sheryl Crow (A&M Records, 1996)
 C'mon, C'mon (A&M Records, 2002)

With Curtis Stigers
 Brighter Days (Columbia Records, 1999)

With Michael Grimm
 Michael Grimm (Epic Records, 2011)

With Vonda Shepard
 By 7:30 (Jacket Records, 1999)
 Chinatown (Edel Records, 2002)

With E. G. Daily
 Lace Around the Wound (A&M Records, 1989)

With Teddy Thompson
 Little Windows (Cooking Vinyl Records, 2016)

With Robbie Williams
 Intensive Care (Chrysalis Records, 2005)

With Olivia Newton-John
 The Rumour (MCA Records, 1988)

With Ilse DeLange
 Next to Me (Universal Music, 2010)

References

1957 births
Living people
People from Redlands, California
American session musicians
20th-century American bass guitarists
Cracker (band) members
Works Progress Administration (band) members